The Evangelisches Gymnasium zum Grauen Kloster, located in suburban Schmargendorf, Berlin, is an independent school with a humanistic profile, known as one of the most prestigious schools in Germany. Founded by the Evangelical Church in West Berlin in 1949 as the Evangelisches Gymnasium, it continues the traditions of the ancient Berlinisches Gymnasium zum Grauen Kloster,  the oldest Gymnasium in Berlin, which for hundreds of years was situated in former monastery buildings in the city's Mitte district, closed by the East Germans in 1958. In 1963 the Evangelisches Gymnasium of West Berlin adopted its traditions and added "zum Grauen Kloster" to its name.

Curriculum
The Evangelisches Gymnasium zum Grauen Kloster is one of the last schools in Berlin offering the entire range of classical education with Latin and Ancient Greek as compulsory subjects. The students learn foreign languages in this order: English (year 5), Latin (year 5), Ancient Greek (year 8), French (year 9 optional). Additionally, it is possible to learn Hebrew.

Extracurricular activities
The debating society deserves particular mention as members of the society have won several Jugend debattiert student competitions over the last years. Rowing and Hockey are popular activities as well.

History

The original school was established on 13 July 1574 by Elector John George of Hohenzollern as the first Protestant Latin school in Brandenburg at the site of a medieval Greyfriars monastery (Graues Kloster), that had been secularised in 1539 in the course of the Reformation. The premises were centered around the Gothic abbey church dating from the 13th century, whose ruins are still being visible near Alexanderplatz.

After the ancient school's buildings had been destroyed by Allied air raids in 1945, the original school moved several times. After the political division of Berlin in 1949, the Gymnasium zum Grauen Kloster found itself in East Berlin and the Evangelical Church established the present school in West Berlin as the Evangelisches Gymnasium. This found a new home in Schmargendorf in 1954. In 1958 the Gymnasium zum Grauen Kloster was officially abolished by the Communist authorities, and in 1963 the Evangelisches Gymnasium adopted its traditions and name.

The remnants of the original school's library, including donations by Sigismund Streit and Christoph Friedrich Nicolai, are now kept at the Zentral- und Landesbibliothek Berlin.

Notable alumni and staff of the Berlinisches Gymnasium
Alumni
Johann Crüger (1598–1662), composer
Johann Gottfried Schadow, (1764–1850), architect
Friedrich Daniel Ernst Schleiermacher, (1768–1834), theologian and philosopher
Karl Friedrich Schinkel, (1781–1841), architect
Friedrich Ludwig Jahn (1778–1852), "father of gymnastics"
Carl Ludwig Christian Rümker (1788–1862), astronomer
Johann Gustav Droysen (1808–1884), German historian
Carl Mayet (1810–1868) chess master
Hermann Lebert (1813–1878), German physician, pathologist
Hermann Bonitz (1814–1888), German scholar
Johann Georg Halske (1814–1890), mechanic and entrepreneur (Siemens & Halske)
Heinrich Ernst Beyrich (1815–1896), geologist
Otto von Bismarck (1815–1898), German statesman
Wilhelm Stieber (1818–1882), secret agent
Emil Rathenau (1838–1915), entrepreneur
Franz Hilgendorf (1839–1904), zoologist
Paul Langerhans (1847–1888), pathologist
Henri James Simon (1851–1932), entrepreneur
Theodor Simon Flatau (1860–1937), physician
Paul Hirsch (1868–1940), politician
Eduard Spranger (1882–1963), philosopher
Carlheinz Neumann (1905–1983), rower
 Franz/François Willi Wendt (1909–1970), painter
Edward Ullendorff (born 1920), German-British academic
Hans Georg Dehmelt (born 1922), physicist (Nobel Prize in Physics 1989)
Hermann Prey (1929–1998), baritone
Lothar de Maizière (born 1940), politician
Anna Mila Guyenz (born 1995), fashion model

Staff
Samuel Rodigast, (1649–1708), poet
Johann Joachim Bellermann (1754–1842), Hebraist
Karl Philipp Moritz (1757–1793), author
Friedrich Daniel Ernst Schleiermacher (1768–1834), theologian
Johann Gustav Droysen (1808–1884), historian
Heinrich Bellermann (1832−1903), music theorist
Anton Friedrich Büsching (1724–1793), geographer, headmaster from 1766

Notable alumni of the Evangelisches Gymnasium
Bernhard Britting (born 1940), rower
Thekla Carola Wied (born 1944), actress
Ulrich Matthes (born 1959), actor
Florian Henckel von Donnersmarck (born 1973), director (Oscar 2007)

See also
Canisius-Kolleg Berlin
Education in Germany
Gymnasium (school)

Bibliography
 Scholtz, H. (1998): Gymnasium zum Grauen Kloster 1874–1974. Bewährungsproben einer Berliner Gymnasialtradition in ihrem vierten Jahrhundert. Dt. Studien-Verl. .
 Dietrich, M. (1997): Berlinische Kloster- und Schulhistorie. Neudr. [der Ausg.] Berlin, Nicolai, 1732. Scherer. .
 Eckstein, F.A. (2005): Nomenclator Philologorum. 1871, Hamburg: korr. Ausgabe von Johannes Saltzwedel Digitalisat

References

External links
 Graues Kloster Website
 Sponsoring Society Graues Kloster Mitte

1949 establishments in West Germany
Private schools in Germany
Gymnasiums in Germany
Educational institutions established in 1949
Schools in Berlin
Charlottenburg-Wilmersdorf